MTV Nederland and België is a Dutch speaking free-to-cable television channel broadcasting in the Netherlands. It launched as MTV NL on 12 September 2000. Before the start of country-specific channels, the Pan-European version of MTV aired in the Netherlands.

The channel is broadcast from a Paramount Networks EMEAA office in Amsterdam, but it uses since january 1, 2022 a broadcast licence from Czech Republic in order not to have obligations under Netherlands medialaw.

History
The European MTV began its services on 1 August 1987. The channel was a joint venture between Viacom, British Telecom and Robert Maxwell. It kicked off in Denmark, Germany, Finland, the Netherlands, Sweden, Switzerland and the United Kingdom. In the early 90s Viacom became the sole owner of MTV by buying the shares of British Telecom and Robert Maxwell. At the end of the 90s MTV Europe began to regionalize its MTV feeds. On 12 September 2000 the localized MTV NL started.

On 14 May 2009 MTV launched its first HD channel in the Netherlands. MTVN HD started on the Caiway cable network and on CanalDigitaal satellite TV. In 2010 followed by the larger cable network UPC Netherlands (3 May). The N stood for Nickelodeon. The channel combined the programs of MTV and Nickelodeon.

On 1 July 2011 MTVN HD changed into MTV Live HD, dropping the programs of Nickelodeon because in many European countries a separate HD-simulcast of Nickelodeon began. In September of that same year Ziggo added MTV Live HD to its line-up.

In Spring of 2012 MTV introduced HD-simulcasts of MTV NL and Comedy Central. On April 3 MTV HD started at UPC Netherlands replacing MTV Live HD. In September 2012 KPN followed.

In Spring 2021, both MTV Netherlands and MTV Belgium were merged into the one channel with localised advertising and sponsorship for both territories. However, both countries are served by separate social media sites and share the same website mtv.nl.

Since 1 January 2022 MTV Netherlands operates with a tv-licence from Czech Republic. Before the channel used a Dutch licence.

Current local shows
(Shows that are running frequently, february 2017)
 MTV Now (3 minutes news reports hosted by Kay Nambiar)
 Ex on The Beach: Double Dutch! (based on the UK version in cooperation with MTV Flanders)
 Dutch Ridiculousness (based on the US version)
 MTV Video Love
 Top 7 @ 7
 MTV Breakfast Club
 3 From 1
 Night Videos

Former local shows

 MTV News
 Rock Chart
 UK Top 10
 M is for Music
 MTV Live

International shows
(Shows that are running frequently, february 2017)
 Are You the One? (US)
 Catfish: The TV Show (US)
 Ex on the Beach (UK)
 Geordie Shore (UK)
 Hollywood Heights (US)
 Judge Geordie (UK)
 Made (US)
 Ridiculousness (US)
 Spring Break with Grandad (UK)
 Teen Mom OG, Teen Mom 2, Teen Mom 3 (US)
 Teen Mom UK (UK)

Presenters
Present

Past
Romeo Egbeama (2000-2003)
Fleur Van Der Kieft (2000-2003)
Georgie
Seth Kamphuijs (2002-2006)
Jeroen Nieuwenhuize
Johnny
Kris (MTV News Specials & MTV Movie Specials) 
Erik de Zwart
Tooske Breugem
Daphne Bunskoek
Mental Theo

See also
 MTV Music 24
 MTV Brand New
 VH1
 VH 1 Classic

Defunct channels in the Netherlands
 Comedy Central Family
 TMF
 TMF NL
 TMF Dance
 TMF Pure
 Kindernet
 The Box Comedy
 The Box

References

External links 
 Official site
 MTV Networks Benelux Site
  MTV Networks Europe Site

MTV channels
Television channels and stations established in 2000
Television channels in the Netherlands
Music organisations based in the Netherlands
Companies based in Amsterdam